Torriana is a frazione and former comune (municipality) in the Province of Rimini in the Italian region Emilia-Romagna, located about  southeast of Bologna and about  southwest of Rimini.

Torriana borders the following municipalities: Borghi, Novafeltria, Poggio Berni, San Leo, Sogliano al Rubicone, Verucchio.

On January 1, 2014, Torriana merged with Poggio Berni, forming a new municipality called Poggio Torriana

Demographic evolution

References

Former municipalities of Emilia-Romagna
Frazioni of the Province of Rimini
Cities and towns in Emilia-Romagna